Huishan District is one of five urban districts of Wuxi, Jiangsu province, China.

The total area of the district is 327.12 km2. In 2006 the population was 388,957.

Administrative divisions
In the present, Huishan District has 5 subdistricts and 2 towns.
5 subdistricts

2 towns
 Luoshe
 Yangshan

Geography 
Huishan Dist. is located at the north of Wuxi, and on the border with Jiangyin on its north.

Education 
One of famous provincial level middle school is Jiangsu Xishan Senior High School, which makes contribution for the junior and senior level of middle school education for Wuxi city, especially for Huishan District of Wuxi.

Preference 
Xishan Senior High School

References

County-level divisions of Jiangsu